McWethy is a surname. Notable people with the surname include:

Edgar Lee McWethy Jr. (1944–1967), United States Army soldier, recipient of the Medal of Honor for his actions in the Vietnam War
John McWethy (1947–2008), American journalist
Robert D. McWethy (born 1920), United States Navy officer and submariner

See also
McWethy Troop Medical Clinic at San Antonio Military Medical Center